Nine Tonight is a live album by American rock band Bob Seger & The Silver Bullet Band, released in 1981 (see 1981 in music). The album was recorded at Cobo Hall in Detroit, Michigan, in June 1980 and at the Boston Garden in Boston, Massachusetts in October 1980. With the exception of three tracks — "Nine Tonight", "Tryin' To Live My Life Without You" and "Let It Rock" — the album is composed entirely of songs drawn from Seger's three previous studio albums. Only "Let It Rock" was repeated from the previous live album Live Bullet. "Tryin' to Live My Life Without You" was released as a single and peaked at number five on the Billboard Hot 100 in the US. The album's title track was originally recorded for the Urban Cowboy soundtrack album.

The 2011 remastered album has a bonus track called "Brave Strangers", which was originally released on Seger's 1978 album Stranger in Town. This live version was originally released as the B-side of the "Tryin' to Live My Life Without You" live single.

Track listing

Track times based upon 2011 remaster.

Tracks recorded in Detroit on 15 June 1980: 8 & 17

Tracks recorded in Detroit on 16 June 1980: 4 & 12

Tracks recorded in Detroit on 19 June 1980: 7 & 10

Tracks recorded in Detroit on 20 June 1980: 11 & 14

Tracks recorded in Detroit on 21 June 1980: 13

Tracks recorded in Boston on 5 October 1980: 5 & 9

Tracks recorded in Boston on 6 October 1980: 1 & 2

Tracks recorded in Boston on 7 October 1980: 3, 6, 15 & 16

Personnel
Bob Seger - acoustic guitar, piano, electric guitar, vocals
Drew Abbott - electric guitar, acoustic guitar
Colleen Beaton - vocals
Chris Campbell - bass, background vocals
Craig Frost - organ, piano, keyboard, clavinet
Kathy Lamb - vocals
Pamela Moore - vocals
Shaun Murphy - percussion, vocals, background vocals, harmony vocals
Alto Reed - organ, flute, horn, alto saxophone, tenor saxophone
David Teegarden - drums, background vocals
June Tilton - vocals

Charts

Weekly charts

Year-end charts

Singles

Certifications
 US: 4× Platinum
 CAN: Platinum

References

1981 live albums
Bob Seger live albums
Capitol Records live albums
Albums produced by Punch Andrews
Albums recorded at the Boston Garden